Miriam Hayman is a Maltese judge.

See also 
Judiciary of Malta

References

External links
https://daphnecaruanagalizia.com/2016/11/three-years-14-new-judges-magistrates-10-linked-directly-labour-party/miriam-hayman-2/

Living people
21st-century Maltese judges
Maltese women
Year of birth missing (living people)
21st-century women judges